Yves Tavernier (born 10 February 1962 in Morzine) is a French former alpine skier who competed in the 1984 Winter Olympics and 1988 Winter Olympics.

External links
 sports-reference.com
 

1962 births
Living people
French male alpine skiers
Olympic alpine skiers of France
Alpine skiers at the 1984 Winter Olympics
Alpine skiers at the 1988 Winter Olympics
Sportspeople from Haute-Savoie
20th-century French people